Hexurella rupicola is a species of spider native to the United States. It was first described by Gertsch and Platnick in 1979. It is from the family Hexurellidae.

References

Spiders of the United States
Mygalomorphae
Spiders described in 1979